The  is a mid-size car manufactured since 2014 by Subaru. According to the company, the name Levorg is an acronym of three words: legacy, revolution and touring. The Levorg shares its platform with the Impreza, Legacy and WRX.

The Levorg was first shown as a pre-production concept car at the 43rd Tokyo Motor Show in November 2013. Subaru began collecting orders on the Japanese market on 4 January 2014, and the car went on sale in May. In February 2015, Subaru announced the introduction of the Levorg on the European market, and the car made its première on the continent at the Geneva Motor Show in March of the same year.



First generation (VM; 2014)

Specifications 

V-Sport 
On 20 November 2019, Subaru launched the 2020 Subaru Levorg V-Sport. It features front sports seats with fabric upholstery, a leather wrapped steering wheel with silver stitching, as well as piano black and chrome trim. As with the variant it is based on, it sports Bilstein dampers, ventilated disc brakes and 225/45 R18 tires. V-Sport will be available in Japan and is priced at JPY 3,150,000.

Sales 
During its advance sales before launch, Subaru received about 11,000 orders in three months, 2,000 short of its projection.

Facelift

Motorsport 

On 12 January 2016, Subaru announced that it was entering the British Touring Car Championship, as a manufacturer entry, in partnership with Team BMR. For the 2016 season, the team were preparing four Levorg Sports Tourers to the championship's Next Generation Touring Car specification. The BTCC Levorgs are configured as rear wheel drive rather than four wheel drive (which is disallowed by the championship's regulations). Former double champions Jason Plato and Colin Turkington piloted the cars, along with team owner Warren Scott. The marque's FA20 2.0 litre boxer engine was race prepared for the team by Mountune Racing.

The 2017 season saw some changes, including Ashley Sutton joining the team from MG Racing. Sutton went on to win the 2017 British Touring Car Championship for the team. Jason Plato continued driving the Levorg, but struggled to find pace throughout the season.

The 2018 season saw Team BMR switch from Mountune to Swindon as engine suppliers for the Levorg.

Second generation (VN; 2020) 

Unveiled as a prototype at the 2019 Tokyo Motor Show on October 23, the second-generation model switched to the Subaru Global Platform, with a newly developed 1.8 L CB18 engine. Like the previous generation, this model would not be sold in North America, but would go on sale in Japan in the second half of 2020.

On August 21, 2020, the second-generation Levorg was released in Japan.

Fuel economy improved from  compared to the preceding generation's FB16 engine.

The second-generation Levorg is sold in Australia as the WRX Sportswagon and in New Zealand as the WRX GT ("Grand Touring"), leveraging the use of the WRX nameplate. For Australia and New Zealand, the Levorg is fitted with the larger FA24F 2.4-litre direct injection turbo engine. On November 25, Subaru announced the FA24F-equipped Levorg also would be sold to the Japanese market as the STI Sport R model.

References

External links 

 
 (Japan)

Levorg
Cars introduced in 2014
2020s cars
Mid-size cars
Station wagons
All-wheel-drive vehicles
Flagship vehicles
Cars powered by boxer engines
Vehicles with CVT transmission
Cars powered by longitudinal 4-cylinder engines